Mostar International Airport is an airport near Mostar, Bosnia and Herzegovina, in the village of Ortiješ,  southeast of Mostar's railway station.

History
Mostar Airport was opened for civilian air traffic in 1965 for domestic flights. Prior to 1965, Mostar was a local airport with a large concrete runway used by aircraft manufacturer SOKO for testing and delivering military aircraft, and sometimes by passenger aircraft.  Currently, the airport primarily serves for Catholics making the pilgrimage to nearby Medjugorje. In 2012, the airport had a twofold increase in traffic, making it the second-busiest in Bosnia and Herzegovina after Sarajevo airport.

Further investments are planned, which include: renovating and expanding the terminal building, expanding the apron, modernising equipment, possible expanding of runway and further education of airport staff in Italy, also building fuel tanks and hangars for private aircraft and for aircraft of the Secondary Traffic school of Mostar which uses the airport for flight school and educating students for future work. Mostar International Airport is considering a possible strategic partnership with investors or, alternatively, a privatisation or concession.

In November 2017, Eurowings was the first airline to schedule regular  flights from Mostar to Düsseldorf and Stuttgart with two weekly flights from May 2018. On 3 May 2018, a Croatia Airlines plane landed at Mostar Airport marking the introduction of direct two weekly Mostar-Zagreb flights. The COVID-19 pandemic has further disrupted the difficult financial situation, causing Croatia Airlines and Eurowings not to continue their planned flights. Also, numerous irregularities in the spending of airport funds and illegally elected administration were noticed. The airport received 1,000,000 Bosnia and Herzegovina convertible marks (€500,000) from the government in March 2021. On 8 September 2021, Croatia Airlines operated first charter flight from Shannon in Ireland to Mostar Airport. Airport management also start negotiating flights with few low cost airlines.

Airlines and destinations
The following airlines operate regular scheduled and charter flights at Mostar Airport:

Controversies
While Sarajevo, Banja Luka and Tuzla's airports have increased their passengers above 100,000; Mostar's airport management has not succeeded in securing any growth. Instead, Mostar Airport continue existing by support of the Federal government. The Airport management has failed in securing flights to diaspora rich destinations such as Sweden, Denmark and Germany.

In 2022, the airport lost its only scheduled service.

Despite a very low number of passengers, 8 million BAM was awarded to the airport.

The current Airport director Ivan Ljubić was appointed against the law since there was no City Council when he assumed office.

Mostar Airport fails to land airplanes diverged from Sarajevo, Tuzla and Banja Luka due to foggy weather conditions. Instead these airplanes are diverted to Serbia and Croatia, even if they are much further away from their original destinations.

Mostar Airport is located in a very attractive position that the management have completely failed to capitalise on. The following reasons are why Mostar airport should be a very active airport:

 Serving the closer towns with more than 400,000 population
 Diaspora from Herzegovina region
 Diaspora from Dalmatia region
 Tourism in Mostar
 Tourism in Herzegovina
 Faith Tourism / pilgrimage to the very visited and world known Medjugorge
 Summer backup for Split and Dubrovnik (Croatia's Dalmatia is extremely high in tourism)
 Closeness to Montenegro

Statistics

The record number of 86,000 passengers was recorded in the year 1990,

See also
 List of airports in Bosnia and Herzegovina
 Banja Luka International Airport
 Sarajevo International Airport
 Tuzla International Airport

References

External links

 
 
 

Buildings and structures in Mostar
Airports in Bosnia and Herzegovina